Trew and Moy railway station was a railway station in County Tyrone, Northern Ireland.

History
The station was opened in 1858 by the Portadown, Dungannon and Omagh Junction Railway, which the Great Northern Railway (GNR) took over in 1876. The station became important in the export of horses from Moy's annual week-long horse fair. The Ulster Transport Authority took over the GNR's remaining lines in Northern Ireland in 1958 and closed the PD&O line on 15 February 1965.

The former station now holds a mushroom distribution business. The main station building, which was on the south side of the station beside the down platform, now contains offices, and the former goods shed is a staff facility. A lower quadrant stop signal, a lower quadrant distant signal and a shunting signal have been relocated to a garden beside the station, along with a wooden shelter from the up platform that has been repurposed as a summer house.

References

Sources

Gallery

Transport in County Tyrone
Railway stations opened in 1858
Railway stations closed in 1965
1958 establishments in Ireland
1965 disestablishments in Northern Ireland
Great Northern Railway (Ireland)
Railway stations in Northern Ireland opened in the 19th century
Railway stations in the Republic of Ireland opened in the 20th century